The 2013–14 UEFA Champions League was the 59th season of Europe's premier club football tournament organised by UEFA, and the 22nd season since it was renamed from the European Champion Clubs' Cup to the UEFA Champions League.

The final was played between Real Madrid and Atlético Madrid at the Estádio da Luz in Lisbon, Portugal, marking it the fifth final to feature two teams from the same association (after the finals of 2000, 2003, 2008, and 2013) and the first time in tournament history that both finalists were from the same city. Real Madrid, who eliminated the title holders, Bayern Munich, in the semi-finals, won in extra time, giving them a record-extending 10th title in the competition. Real equalized late in the second half through Sergio Ramos and then pulled away during extra time to win 4–1.

For the first time, the clubs who qualified for the group stage also qualified for the newly formed 2013–14 UEFA Youth League, a competition available to players aged 19 or under.

Association team allocation
A total of 76 teams from 52 of the 54 UEFA member associations participated in the 2013–14 UEFA Champions League (the exceptions being Liechtenstein, which do not organise a domestic league, and Gibraltar, which started participating in the 2014–15 season after being admitted as a UEFA member in May 2013). The association ranking based on the UEFA country coefficients was used to determine the number of participating teams for each association:
Associations 1–3 each have four teams qualify.
Associations 4–6 each have three teams qualify.
Associations 7–15 each have two teams qualify.
Associations 16–53 (except Liechtenstein) each have one team qualify.
The winners of the 2012–13 UEFA Champions League were given an additional entry as title holders if they would not qualify for the 2013–14 UEFA Champions League through their domestic league (because of the restriction that no association can have more than four teams playing in the Champions League, if the title holders are from the top three associations and finish outside the top four in their domestic league, the title holders' entry comes at the expense of the fourth-placed team of their association). However, this additional entry was not necessary for this season since the title holders qualified for the tournament through their domestic league.

Association ranking
For the 2013–14 UEFA Champions League, the associations were allocated places according to their 2012 UEFA country coefficients, which took into account their performance in European competitions from 2007–08 to 2011–12.

Distribution
Since the title holders (Bayern Munich) qualified for the Champions League group stage through their domestic league, the group stage spot reserved for the title holders is vacated, and the following changes to the default allocation system are made:
The champions of association 13 (Denmark) are promoted from the third qualifying round to the group stage.
The champions of association 16 (Cyprus) are promoted from the second qualifying round to the third qualifying round.
The champions of associations 48 (Northern Ireland) and 49 (Luxembourg) are promoted from the first qualifying round to the second qualifying round.

Teams
League positions of the previous season shown in parentheses (TH: Title holders).

Notes

Round and draw dates
The schedule of the competition was as follows (all draws held at UEFA headquarters in Nyon, Switzerland, unless stated otherwise).

Qualifying rounds

In the qualifying rounds and the play-off round, teams were divided into seeded and unseeded teams based on their 2013 UEFA club coefficients, and then drawn into two-legged home-and-away ties. Teams from the same association could not be drawn against each other.

First qualifying round
The draws for the first and second qualifying rounds were held on 24 June 2013. The first legs were played on 2 July, and the second legs were played on 9 July 2013.

Second qualifying round
The first legs were played on 16 and 17 July, and the second legs were played on 23 and 24 July 2013.

Third qualifying round
The third qualifying round was split into two separate sections: one for champions and one for non-champions. The losing teams in both sections entered the 2013–14 UEFA Europa League play-off round.

Play-off round

The play-off round was split into two separate sections: one for champions and one for non-champions. The losing teams in both sections entered the 2013–14 UEFA Europa League group stage.

The draw for the play-off round was held on 9 August 2013. The first legs were played on 20 and 21 August, and the second legs were played on 27 and 28 August 2013.

On 14 August 2013, Metalist Kharkiv were disqualified from the 2013–14 UEFA club competitions because of previous match-fixing. UEFA decided to replace Metalist Kharkiv in the Champions League play-off round with PAOK, who were eliminated by Metalist Kharkiv in the third qualifying round.

Red Bull Salzburg lodged a protest after being defeated by Fenerbahçe in the third qualifying round, but it was rejected by UEFA and the Court of Arbitration for Sport.

Group stage

The draw for the group stage was held in Monaco on 29 August 2013. The 32 teams were allocated into four pots based on their 2013 UEFA club coefficients, with the title holders, Bayern Munich, being placed in Pot 1 automatically. They were drawn into eight groups of four, with the restriction that teams from the same association could not be drawn against each other.

In each group, teams played against each other home-and-away in a round-robin format. The matchdays were 17–18 September, 1–2 October, 22–23 October, 5–6 November, 26–27 November, and 10–11 December 2013. The group winners and runners-up advanced to the round of 16, while the third-placed teams entered the 2013–14 UEFA Europa League round of 32.

A total of 18 national associations were represented in the group stage. Austria Wien made their debut appearance in the group stage.

Teams that qualify for the group stage also participate in the newly formed 2013–14 UEFA Youth League, a competition available to players aged 19 or under.

See the detailed group stage page for tiebreakers if two or more teams are equal on points.

Group A

Group B

Group C

Group D

Group E

Group F

Group G

Group H

Knockout phase

In the knockout phase, teams played against each other over two legs on a home-and-away basis, except for the one-match final. The mechanism of the draws for each round was as follows:
In the draw for the round of 16, the eight group winners were seeded, and the eight group runners-up were unseeded. The seeded teams were drawn against the unseeded teams, with the seeded teams hosting the second leg. Teams from the same group or the same association could not be drawn against each other.
In the draws for the quarter-finals onwards, there were no seedings, and teams from the same group or the same association could be drawn against each other.

Bracket

Round of 16
The draw for the round of 16 was held on 16 December 2013. The first legs were played on 18, 19, 25 and 26 February, and the second legs were played on 11, 12, 18 and 19 March 2014.

|}

Quarter-finals
The draw for the quarter-finals was held on 21 March 2014. The first legs were played on 1 and 2 April, and the second legs were played on 8 and 9 April 2014.

|}

Semi-finals
The draw for the semi-finals and final (to determine the "home" team for administrative purposes) was held on 11 April 2014. The first legs were played on 22 and 23 April, and the second legs were played on 29 and 30 April 2014.

|}

Final

Statistics
Statistics exclude qualifying rounds and play-off round.

Top goalscorers

Top assists

Squad of the Season
The UEFA technical study group selected the following 18 players as the squad of the tournament:

See also
2013–14 UEFA Europa League
2013–14 UEFA Youth League
2014 UEFA Super Cup
2014 FIFA Club World Cup
2013–14 UEFA Women's Champions League

References

External links

2013–14 UEFA Champions League

 
1
2013-14